Clive Barker (born 5 October 1952) is an English novelist, playwright, author, film director, and visual artist who came to prominence in the mid-1980s with a series of short stories, the Books of Blood, which established him as a leading horror writer. He has since written many novels and other works. His fiction has been adapted into films, notably the Hellraiser series, the first installment of which he also wrote and directed, and the Candyman series. He was also an executive producer of the film Gods and Monsters, which won an Academy Award for Best Adapted Screenplay.

Barker's paintings and illustrations have been shown in galleries in the United States, and have appeared in his books. He has also created characters and series for comic books, and some of his more popular horror stories have been featured in ongoing comics series.

Early life
Barker was born in Liverpool, the son of Joan Ruby (née Revill), a painter and school welfare officer, and Leonard Barker, a personnel director for an industrial relations firm. He was educated at Dovedale Primary School, Quarry Bank High School and the University of Liverpool, where he studied English and philosophy.

When he was three, Barker witnessed the French skydiver Léo Valentin plummet to his death during a performance at an air show in Liverpool. He later alluded to Valentin in many of his stories.

Theatrical work 
Barker's involvement in live theatre began while still in school with productions of Voodoo and Inferno in 1967. He collaborated on six plays with Theatre of the Imagination in 1974 and two more that he was the sole writer of, A Clowns' Sodom and Day of the Dog, for The Mute Pantomime Theatre in 1976 and 1977.

He co-founded the avant-garde theatrical troupe The Dog Company in 1978 with former school friends and up and coming actors, many of whom would go on to become key collaborators in Barker's film work. Doug Bradley would take on the iconic role of Pinhead in the Hellraiser series while Peter Atkins would write the scripts for the first three Hellraiser sequels. Over the next five years Barker would write nine plays, often serving as director, including some of his most well-known stage productions, The History of The Devil, Frankenstein in Love, and The Secret Life of Cartoons.

From 1982 to 1983, he also created three plays, including Crazyface, for the Cockpit Youth Theatre.

His theatrical work would come to a close as he shifted focus to writing the Books of Blood.

Writing career
Barker is an author of horror and fantasy. He began writing horror early in his career, mostly in the form of short stories (collected in Books of Blood 1–6) and the Faustian novel The Damnation Game (1985). Later he moved toward modern-day fantasy and urban fantasy with horror elements in Weaveworld (1987), The Great and Secret Show (1989), the world-spanning Imajica (1991), and Sacrament (1996).

When Books of Blood was first published in the United States in paperback, Stephen King was quoted on the book covers: "I have seen the future of horror and his name is Clive Barker." As influences on his writing, Barker lists Herman Melville, Edgar Allan Poe, Ray Bradbury, William S. Burroughs, William Blake, and Jean Cocteau, among others.

He is the writer of the best-selling Abarat series.

Personal life
During his early years as a writer, Barker occasionally worked as a prostitute when his writing did not provide sufficient income.

In 2003, he received the Davidson/Valentini Award at the 15th GLAAD Media Awards.

Barker is critical of organized religion, but has said that the Bible influences his work and spirituality. In a 2003 appearance on Politically Incorrect, he said that he was a Christian after Ann Coulter implied he was not. Years later, he said on Facebook that he did not identify himself as a Christian.

Barker said in a December 2008 online interview (published in March 2009) that he had throat polyps which were so severe, a doctor told him he was taking in only 10% of the air he was supposed to. He has had two surgeries to remove them and believes his voice has improved as a result. He said he did not have cancer, and has given up cigars.

In 2012, Barker entered a coma for several days after contracting toxic shock syndrome, triggered by a visit to a dentist where a spillage of poisonous bacteria entered his bloodstream, almost killing him. Realising he might have just a short time to live, he decided to put his personal concerns about the world and society into the upcoming novel Deep Hill, which he thought could be his final book.

As of 2015, he is a member of the board of advisers for the Hollywood Horror Museum.

Relationships
While appearing on the radio call-in show Loveline on 20 August 1996, Barker said that in his teens he had several relationships with older women, but came to identify himself as homosexual by 18 or 19. His relationship with John Gregson lasted from 1975 until 1986.

He later spent 13 years with photographer David Armstrong, described as his husband in the introduction to Coldheart Canyon; they separated in 2009.

Film work

Barker wrote the screenplays for Underworld (1985) and Rawhead Rex (1986), both directed by George Pavlou. Displeased by how his material was handled, he moved to directing with Hellraiser (1987), based on his novella The Hellbound Heart. After his film Nightbreed (1990) flopped, Barker returned to write and direct Lord of Illusions (1995). The short story "The Forbidden", from Barker's Books of Blood, provided the basis for the 1992 film Candyman and its three sequels. He had been working on a series of film adaptations of his The Abarat Quintet books under The Walt Disney Company's management, but due to creative differences, the project was cancelled.

He served as an executive producer for the 1998 film Gods and Monsters, a semi-fictional tale of Frankenstein director James Whale's later years, which won an Academy Award for Best Adapted Screenplay. Barker said of his interest in the project: "Whale was gay, I'm gay; Whale was English, I'm English…Whale made some horror movies, and I've made some horror movies. It seemed as if I should be helping to tell this story." Barker also provided the foreword on the published shooting script.

In 2005, Barker and horror film producer Jorge Saralegui created the film production company Midnight Picture Show with the intent of producing two horror films per year.

In October 2006, Barker announced through his website that he will be writing the script to a forthcoming remake of the original Hellraiser film. He is developing a film based on his Tortured Souls line of toys from McFarlane Toys. In 2020, Barker regained control of the Hellraiser franchise, and served as executive producer on a 2022 reboot film for the streaming service Hulu.

Television work
In May 2015, Variety reported that Clive Barker was developing a television series adaptation of various creepypastas in partnership with Warner Brothers, to be called Clive Barker's Creepypastas, a feature arc based on Slender Man and Ben Drowned. Barker was involved in a streaming service film adaptation of The Books of Blood in 2020, and is developing a Nightbreed television series directed by Michael Dougherty and written by Josh Stolberg for SyFy. In April 2020, HBO was announced to be developing a Hellraiser television series that would serve as "an elevated continuation and expansion" of its mythology with Mark Verheiden and Michael Dougherty writing the series and David Gordon Green directing several episodes. Verheiden, Dougherty and Green will also be executive producing the series with Danny McBride, Jody Hill, Brandon James and Roy Lee of Vertigo Entertainment.

Visual art
Barker is a prolific visual artist, often illustrating his own books. His paintings have been seen first on the covers of his official fan club magazine, Dread, published by Fantaco in the early '90s; on the covers of the collections of his plays, Incarnations (1995) and Forms of Heaven (1996); and on the second printing of the original British publications of his Books of Blood series. Barker also provided the artwork for his young adult novel The Thief of Always and for the Abarat series. His artwork has been exhibited at Bert Green Fine Art in Los Angeles and Chicago, at the Bess Cutler Gallery in New York and La Luz De Jesus in Los Angeles. Many of his sketches and paintings can be found in the collection Clive Barker, Illustrator, published in 1990 by Arcane/Eclipse Books, and in Visions of Heaven and Hell, published in 2005 by Rizzoli Books.

He worked on the horror video game Clive Barker's Undying, providing the voice for the character Ambrose. Undying was developed by DreamWorks Interactive and released in 2001. He worked on Clive Barker's Jericho for Codemasters, which was released in late 2007.

Barker created Halloween costume designs for Disguise Costumes.

Around 150 art works by Barker were used in the set of the Academy of the Unseen Arts for the Netflix TV series Chilling Adventures of Sabrina.

Comic books
Barker published his Razorline imprint via Marvel Comics in 1993.

Barker horror adaptations and spin-offs in comics include the Marvel/Epic Comics series Hellraiser, Nightbreed, Pinhead, The Harrowers, Book of the Damned, and Jihad; Eclipse Books' series and graphic novels Tapping The Vein, Dread, Son of Celluloid, Revelations, The Life of Death, Rawhead Rex and The Yattering and Jack, and Dark Horse Comics' Primal, among others. Barker served as a consultant and wrote issues of the Hellraiser anthology comic book.

In 2005, IDW published a three-issue adaptation of Barker's children's fantasy novel The Thief of Always, written and painted by Kris Oprisko and Gabriel Hernandez. IDW is publishing a 12 issue adaptation of Barker's novel The Great and Secret Show.

In December 2007, Chris Ryall and Clive Barker announced an upcoming collaboration of an original comic book series, Torakator, to be published by IDW.

In October 2009, IDW published Seduth, co-written by Barker. The work was released with three variant covers.

In 2011, Boom! Studios began publishing an original Hellraiser comic book series.

In 2013, Boom! Studios announced Next Testament, the first original story by Barker to be published in comic book format.

Works

Novels 

 The Damnation Game (1985)
 Hellraiser series:
 The Hellbound Heart (1986)
 The Scarlet Gospels (2015)
  Hellraiser: The Toll (2018) (story only, written by Mark Alan Miller)
 Weaveworld (1987)
 Cabal (1988)
 Books of the Art series:
 The Great and Secret Show (1989)
 Everville (1994)
 Imajica (1991)
 The Thief of Always (1992)
 Sacrament (1996)
 Galilee (1998)
 Coldheart Canyon (2001)
 Tortured Souls (2001). Novelette starring the characters of the series of first six action figures of Tortured Souls. In 2015 it was published with title Tortured Souls: The Legend of Primordium.
 The Books of Abarat:
 Abarat (2002)
 Days of Magic, Nights of War (2004)
 Absolute Midnight (2011)
 The Infernal Parade (2004). Novelette detailing the backstories of the characters of the series of six action figures of The Infernal Parade. In 2017 it was published with title Infernal Parade.
 Mister B. Gone (2007)
 Mr. Maximillian Bacchus And His Travelling Circus (2009)
 Chiliad: A Meditation (2014)
 Deep Hill (TBA)

Short story collections 

Books of Blood (1984–1985)
The Inhuman Condition (1986)
The Essential Clive Barker: Selected Fiction (2000). Contains more than seventy excerpts from novels and plays and four full-length short stories.
First Tales (2013)
Tonight, Again: Tales of Love, Lust and Everything in Between (2015). Contains 32 short stories.
Fear Eternal (TBA)

Poetry 
 "The Presence of This Breath" (TBA)

Plays 

 A Clowns' Sodom (The Mute Pantomime Theatre, 1976)
 Day of the Dog (The Mute Pantomime Theatre, 1977)
 The Sack (The Dog Company, 1978)
 The Magician (The Dog Company, 1978)
 Dog (The Dog Company, 1979)
 Nightlives (The Dog Company, 1979)
 History of the Devil (The Dog Company, 1980)
 Dangerous World (The Dog Company, 1981)
 Paradise Street (The Dog Company, 1981)
 Frankenstein in Love (The Dog Company, 1982)
 The Secret Life of Cartoons (The Dog Company, 1982)
 Crazyface (Cockpit Youth Theatre, 1982)
 Subtle Bodies (Cockpit Youth Theatre, 1983)
 Colossus (Cockpit Youth Theatre, 1983)

Collections

 Incarnations: Three Plays (1995)
Forms of Heaven: Three Plays (1996)

Non-fiction 

Art

 Clive Barker, Illustrator series:
 Clive Barker, Illustrator (1990)
 Illustrator II: The Art of Clive Barker (1992)
 Visions of Heaven and Hell (2005)
 Clive Barker: Imaginer series:
 Clive Barker: Imaginer Volume 1 (2014)
 Clive Barker: Imaginer Volume 2 (2015)
 Clive Barker: Imaginer Volume 3 (2016)
 Clive Barker: Imaginer Volume 4 (2017)
 Clive Barker: Imaginer Volume 5 (2018)
 Clive Barker: Imaginer Volume 6 (2018)
 Clive Barker: Imaginer Volume 7 (2020)
 Clive Barker: Imaginer Volume 8 (2020)
Essays

 The Painter, the Creature and the Father of Lies (2011)

Toys 

 Tortured Souls (2001–2002). Series of 12 action figures (six designed in 2001 and six in 2002) and a novelette starring the characters of the first six action figures
 The Infernal Parade (2004) Co-created with Todd McFarlane, series of six action figures and a novelette detailing the backstories of the characters.

Filmography

Other adaptations 
 Quicksilver Highway (1997) - a TV film featuring a segment based on Barker's short story "The Body Politic" from Books of Blood: Volume Four
Masters of Horror: "Haeckel's Tale" (2006) - based on Barker's short story "Haeckel's Tale" from Dark Delicacies: Original Tales of Terror and the Macabre
Candyman (2021) - based on Barker's short story "The Forbidden" from Books of Blood: Volume Five

Video games 
 Clive Barker's Nightbreed: The Action Game (1990)
 Nightbreed, The Interactive Movie (1990)
 Clive Barker's Undying (2001)
 Clive Barker's Demonik (cancelled 2006)
 Clive Barker's Jericho (2007)

See also
 
 Cenobite
 Lemarchand's box
 List of horror fiction writers
 Splatterpunk

References

Further reading
Critical studies of Barker's work
 Smith, Andrew. "Worlds that Creep upon You: Postmodern Illusions in the Work of Clive Barker." In Clive Bloom, ed, Creepers: British Horror and Fantasy in the Twentieth Century. London and Boulder CO: Pluto Press, 1993, pp. 176–86.
 Suzanne J. Barbieri, Clive Barker : Mythmaker for the Millennium. Stockport:British Fantasy Society, 1994,  .
 Gary Hoppenstand, Clive Barker's short stories : imagination as metaphor in the Books of blood and other works. (With a foreword by Clive Barker). Jefferson, N.C. : McFarland, 1994, .
 Linda Badley, Writing Horror and The Body : the fiction of Stephen King, Clive Barker, and Anne Rice. London : Greenwood Press, 1996, .
 Chris Morgan, "Barker, Clive", in David Pringle, ed., St. James Guide to Horror, Ghost and Gothic Writers. London: St. James Press, 1998,  
 S. T. Joshi, The Modern Weird Tale Jefferson, N.C.; London : McFarland, 2001, .
 Douglas E. Winter, Clive Barker: The Dark Fantastic New York: Harper, 2002, .
 Edwin F. Casebeer, "Clive Barker (1952– )" in: Darren Harris-Fain (ed.) British Fantasy and Science Fiction Writers Since 1960. Farmington Hills, MI: Thomson/Gale, 2002, .
 K. A. Laity, "Clive Barker" in: Richard Bleiler, ed. Supernatural Fiction Writers: Contemporary Fantasy and Horror. New York: Thomson/Gale, 2003,  .  
 Sorcha Ní Fhlainn, (Ed.) Clive Barker – Dark imaginer. Manchester: Manchester University Press, 2017. 280pp. .

External links

 Official website 
 
 
 
 
 Clive Barker  at ComicBookDB.com
 WorldCat entry 
 Clive Barker at Library of Congress Authorities – with 50 catalogue records

1952 births
Living people
Artists from Liverpool
Alumni of the University of Liverpool
English comics writers
English horror writers
English illustrators
English male prostitutes
Fantasy artists
English fantasy writers
Gay novelists
Gay male prostitutes
Horror film directors
British speculative fiction artists
Horror artists
Inkpot Award winners
LGBT film directors
LGBT comics creators
Gay screenwriters
People educated at Quarry Bank High School
People educated at Calderstones School
Splatterpunk
World Fantasy Award-winning writers
Writers who illustrated their own writing
Video game writers
Lambda Literary Award winners
20th-century English painters
English male painters
21st-century English painters
21st-century English male artists
20th-century English novelists
21st-century British novelists
Gay dramatists and playwrights
English LGBT novelists
English LGBT screenwriters
English LGBT dramatists and playwrights
English male dramatists and playwrights
English male short story writers
English short story writers
Dark fantasy writers
Marvel Comics people
Weird fiction writers